Larry Mitchell (1939 – December26, 2012) was an American author and publisher. He was the founder of Calamus Books - an early small press devoted to gay male literature - and the author of fiction dealing with the gay male experience in New York City during the 1970s and 1980s.

With Terry Helbing and Felice Picano, he cofounded Gay Presses of New York in 1981.  His book of short stories My Life As a Mole won the 1989 Small Press Lambda Literary Award.  Mitchell's novel The Terminal Bar, published in 1982, is considered to be the first book of fiction to address HIV/AIDS.  In addition to his own work, he was friends with and collaborated with many prominent gay artists working in New York City in the 1970s and 1980s including William "Bill" Rice, David Wojnarowicz, Peter Hujar and Gary Indiana.  The feature film Acid Snow (1998) directed by Joel Itman is based on Mitchell's novel of the same name.

Mitchell received a PhD in Sociology from Columbia University. At that time,  he co-edited the book "Willard Waller on The Family, Education and War" with William J. Goode and Frank Furstenberg published in 1970.   He was born in Muncie, Indiana, in 1939 and died on December 26, 2012, in  Ithaca, New York, after a battle with pancreatic cancer.

Works

Books 

Acid Snow (Calamus Books, 1992) 
My Life As A Mole and Five Other Stories (Calamus Books, 1988)
In Heat: A Romance (Gay Presses of New York, 1986)
The Terminal Bar (Calamus Books, 1982)
The Faggots & Their Friends Between Revolutions (Calamus Books, 1977)
Great Gay in the Morning (with The Lavender Hill Group, Times Change Press, 1972)
Willard Waller on The Family, Education and War (with William J. Goode and Frank F. Furstenberg, University of Chicago Press, 1970)

Plays 
Get It While You Can (Presented November 1986 at Theater for the New City, New York City)
An Evening of Faggot Theater (with The Pink Satin Bomber Collective.  Presented March–May 1978 at the Performing Garage, New York City)

References

External links
The Terminal Bar at Goodreads

1939 births
2012 deaths
American gay writers
American publishers (people)
People from Muncie, Indiana
Lambda Literary Award winners
Radical Faeries members